Brendan Kenneally (born 1 April 1955) is a former Irish Fianna Fáil politician. He was a Teachta Dála (TD) for the Waterford constituency, he was first elected to Dáil Éireann at the 1989 general election. In February 1992, he was appointed as Minister of State at the Department of Tourism, Transport and Communications by the Taoiseach Albert Reynolds, serving until January 1993. He was re-elected at subsequent elections until his defeat at the 2002 general election. He then became a member of the 22nd Seanad, nominated by the Taoiseach. He regained his Dáil seat at the 2007 general election.

Kenneally's father Billy Kenneally also served as a TD for Waterford from 1965 to 1982, and his grandfather William Kenneally served as a TD for Waterford from 1952 to 1961.

The Sunday Tribune reported that while a senator, between 2005 and 2007, Kenneally ran up total expenses amounting to €139,189. On 3 August 2009, the Irish Independent revealed that Kenneally was one of the TDs with the highest expense claims in Dáil Éireann in 2008. He claimed €73,857 in expenses. He lost his seat at the 2011 general election.

In 2016, after his cousin was convicted of 1980s sexual abuse of boys, Brendan Kenneally revealed that he had been approached in 2002 by one victim's family but had not informed the Garda because the victim did not want him to. This caused controversy in 2020 for Mary Butler, his successor as Waterford Fianna Fáil TD, who apologised for allowing him to canvass for her in the general election and for renting an office from him.

See also
Families in the Oireachtas

References

 

1955 births
Living people
Fianna Fáil TDs
Local councillors in County Waterford
Mayors of Waterford
Members of the 22nd Seanad
Members of the 26th Dáil
Members of the 27th Dáil
Members of the 28th Dáil
Members of the 30th Dáil
Ministers of State of the 26th Dáil
Politicians from County Waterford
Nominated members of Seanad Éireann
Fianna Fáil senators
Alumni of Waterford Institute of Technology